Alan Ronald Merrick (born 20 June 1950) is a retired professional association footballer who played as a defender in England, the North American Soccer League and the Major Indoor Soccer League. Born in England, he earned one cap with the United States national team in 1983, having previously represented the England U18.

Club career
Merrick was born in Selly Oak, Birmingham, but grew up in North Warwickshire, where he attended Water Orton Junior School and Coleshill Grammar School. He joined West Bromwich Albion in July 1966, turning professional in August 1967. He made his senior debut in September 1968 in a League Cup tie against Peterborough United and in the same year won three England youth caps. In 1975 the team loaned Merrick to second division club Peterborough. At the end of the season, Merrick moved to the USA where he signed with the Minnesota Kicks of the North American Soccer League. Merrick remained with the Kicks through the 1979 season when he moved to the Los Angeles Aztecs. Merrick moved again at the end of the season, to the San Jose Earthquakes for the 1981 season. However, after twelve games, the Earthquakes traded Merrick to the Minnesota Kicks. At the end of the 1981 season, the Kicks traded Merrick to the Toronto Blizzard for the 1982 season. In 1983, the U.S. Soccer Federation, in coordination with the NASL, entered the U.S. national team, known as Team America, into the NASL as a league franchise. The team drew on U.S. citizens playing in the NASL, Major Indoor Soccer League and American Soccer League. Merrick left the Blizzard and signed with Team America. When Team America finished the 1983 season with a 10–20 record, the worst in the NASL, USSF withdrew the team from the league.

International career
In 1968, Merrick played three times for the England national under-18 football team at the Junior World Cup Tournament in the South of  France against Bulgaria, Russia and the Netherlands

On 8 April 1983, Merrick earned one cap with the U.S. national team in a 2–0 victory over Haiti. He started the game, but subbed out for Erhardt Kapp in the second half. Present web site and contact can be found at www.kicksbest.com

Coaching career
In 1983, Merrick retired from playing and joined the coaching ranks with the Minnesota Strikers. At the time, the Strikers played in the NASL, but after the collapse of the league in 1984, the Strikers moved to Major Indoor Soccer League. Merrick continued to coach them through the 1987–1988 season. He is currently the head coach of the University of Minnesota men's club team. Additionally, he continues to train coaches and young players through his Minneapolis-based academy. In April 2012, Merrick was named head coach of the Eagan High School boys soccer team.

References

External links
West Bromwich bio
NASL/MISL stats

1950 births
Living people
American soccer coaches
American soccer players
English expatriate footballers
English expatriate sportspeople in Canada
English footballers
English emigrants to the United States
Expatriate soccer players in Canada
Expatriate soccer players in the United States
Association football defenders
Los Angeles Aztecs players
Major Indoor Soccer League (1978–1992) coaches
Major Indoor Soccer League (1978–1992) players
Minnesota Kicks players
North American Soccer League (1968–1984) coaches
North American Soccer League (1968–1984) players
Footballers from Birmingham, West Midlands
Peterborough United F.C. players
Pittsburgh Spirit players
San Jose Earthquakes (1974–1988) players
Soccer players from Minnesota
Team America (NASL) players
Toronto Blizzard (1971–1984) players
United States men's international soccer players
West Bromwich Albion F.C. players
England youth international footballers
Minnesota Strikers coaches
English expatriate sportspeople in the United States